{{Infobox settlement
| name                            = Balikpapan
| official_name                   = City of Balikpapan  
| native_name                     = 
| settlement_type                 = City
| image_skyline                   = 
| image_flag                      = 
| image_shield                    = Coat of arms of Balikpapan.svg
| nicknames                       = id: Balikpapan Kota Beriman
(Balikpapan, City of Believers)
| motto                           = bjn: Gawi Manuntung Waja Sampai Kaputing
(Hard Work until Finish)
| anthem                          = Hymne Balikpapan"
| image_map1                      = 
| map_caption1                    = Interactive Map of Balikpapan
| image_map                       = Lokasi Kalimantan Timur Kota Balikpapan.svg
| map_caption                     = Location within East Kalimantan
| pushpin_map                     = Indonesia_Kalimantan#Indonesia
| pushpin_label_position          = left
| pushpin_map_caption             = Location in Kalimantan and Indonesia
| coordinates                     = 
| subdivision_type               = Country
| subdivision_name               = 
| subdivision_type1               = Region
| subdivision_type2               = Province
| subdivision_name1               = Kalimantan
| subdivision_name2               =  East Kalimantan
| established_title               = Established
| established_date                = 10 February 1897
| government_type                 = City
| governing_body                  = City of Balikpapan Government
| leader_title                    = Mayor
| leader_name                     = Rahmad Mas'ud
| area_total_km2                  = 503.3
| area_land_km2                   = 
| area_water_km2                  = 160.1
| area_water_percent              = 
| elevation_m                     = 52
| elevation_ft                    = 
| population_total                = 695287
| population_as_of                = mid 2021 estimate
| population_density_km2          = auto
| population_urban                = 
| population_metro                = 
| demographics_type1              = Demographics
| timezone                        = WITA
| utc_offset                      = +8
| timezone_DST                    = 
| utc_offset_DST                  = 
| demographics1_title1            = 
| postal_code_type                = Postal Code
| postal_code                     = 
| area_code                       = (+62) 542
| blank_name_sec1                 = HDI (2019)
| blank_info_sec1                 =  0.801
| registration_plate              = KT
| blank_name_sec2                 = Airport
| blank_info_sec2                 = Sultan Aji Muhammad
Sulaiman Sepinggan International Airport
| website                         = balikpapan.go.id
| footnotes                       = 
| leader_title2                   = Vice Mayor
| leader_name2                    = Vacant
| demographics1_info1             = 
| demographics1_info2             = Islam 89.50% Protestanism 7.51% Catholic 1.78% Buddhism 0.95% Hinduism 0.12% Confucianism 0.01%  Others 0.01%
| demographics1_title2            = 
| etymology                       = id: Balik (Behind) and Papan (Plank)
}}

Balikpapan is a seaport city in East Kalimantan, Indonesia. Located on the east coast of the island of Borneo, the city is the financial center of Kalimantan. Balikpapan is the city with the largest economy in Kalimantan with an estimated 2016 GDP at Rp 73.18 trillion. The city has the third busiest airport in Kalimantan after that in Banjarmasin and Pontianak, namely Sultan Aji Muhammad Sulaiman Sepinggan Airport. Port of Semayang was the second busiest seaport in East Kalimantan, after that in Samarinda.

With a population of 688,318 according to the 2020 census, and an official estimate of 695,287 as at mid 2021, Balikpapan is the second most populous city in East Kalimantan, after Samarinda. Balikpapan has been consistently ranked as one of the most liveable cities in Indonesia.

Balikpapan was originally a fishing village built by Buginese people in the 19th century. The first oil drilling began in Balikpapan on 10 February 1897, which was later set as the anniversary of the city. In 1899, the Dutch East Indies colonial administration granted a township status to Balikpapan. In 1907, Bataafsche Petroleum Maatschappij (BPM) made the city as its headquarters and imported skilled laborers, engineers, and managers from overseas. Subsequently, numerous multi-national companies came to Balikpapan to invest in the oil industry. This resulted in the economic boom of Balikpapan and attracted many migrants and expatriates.

During World War II, the Empire of Japan occupied the city in 1942, as part of the occupation of Indonesia, and it was bombed by the Allies in first Balikpapan Battle in 1942 and second battle in 1945. The battles impacted critical infrastructure, including the oil refinery stations and seaport which were completely burned to the ground. Upon Indonesia's independence, BPM extended its activities in Balikpapan until 1965 when Pertamina, the Indonesian state-owned oil company, took control over the ownership of BPM and its oil exploration activities.

Etymology and nicknames
There are several popular stories and legends explaining the origin of Balikpapan:

 The 10 pieces of board returned to Jenebora from the 1,000 pieces requested by the Sultan of Kutai as donations of building materials for the construction of the New Kutai Palace. The ten boards that were returned were referred to by the people of Kutai as Balikpapan Tu. So that the area along Balikpapan Bay, precisely in Jenebora is called Balikpapan.
 Tribe of Pasir Balik (native people of Balikpapan) is a descendant of grandfather and grandmother named Kayun Kuleng and Papan Ayun. So that the area along Balikpapan Bay by its descendants is called Kuleng-Papan or means Balikpapan (in Paser, Kuleng means Balik).
 In other legends it is also mentioned the origin of Balikpapan, namely from a daughter who was released by her father a king who did not want his daughter to fall into the hands of the enemy. The daughter who was still a toddler was tied up on several pieces of board in a state of lying. Because it was carried away and hit by waves, the board was reversed. When the board was stranded on the shore found by a fisherman and so it turned out that there was a daughter who was still bound. It is said that the princess was named Putri Petung who came from the Kingdom of Sand. So that the area where it was found was called Balikpapan.

The city has had several nicknames throughout its history such as the Oil City, City of Believers (Kota Beriman), which uniquely "BERIMAN" word is acronym from: BERsih (clean), Indah (magnificent), dan nyaMAN (comfortable).

History

Before the oil boom of the early 1900s, Balikpapan was an isolated Bugis fishing village. Balikpapan's toponym (balik = "behind" and papan = "plank") is from a folk story in which a local king threw his newborn daughter into the sea to protect her from his enemies. The baby was tied beneath some planks that were discovered by a fisherman. An alternative story is that, at the time of the Kutai sultanate, Sultan Muhammad Idris sent 1000 planks to aid the Paser Kingdom to build a new palace. The planks were shipped from Kutai to Paser along the Borneo shoreline by roping all the planks together. 10 out of the 1000 planks that were originally shipped resurfaced in a place currently called Balikpapan.

Oil development
On 10 February 1897, a small refinery company, Mathilda, began the first oil drilling. Building of roads, wharves, warehouses, offices, barracks, and bungalows started when the Dutch oil company Bataafsche Petroleum Maatschappij (BPM) arrived in the area.

Second World War

On 24 January 1942, a Japanese invasion convoy arrived at Balikpapan and was attacked by four United States Navy destroyers that sank three Japanese transports. The Japanese army landed and met with no opposition by the Dutch troops, which had been ordered to evacuate after destroying the oil installations. In responds to this, the Japanese massacred 78 Dutch POWs and civilians.

Royal Australian Air Force (RAAF) intelligence determined that half of all lubricating oils used by the Japanese military and 60 percent of all their aviation fuel came from refineries in Balikpapan, and it was therefore an extremely important target. The American 380th Bombardment Group under the command of the RAAF, including the famous B-24 Liberator Shady Lady, attacked the oil refineries in August 1943 from Darwin, Australia. Amazingly, there were no aircraft losses, despite the crash landing and subsequent repair of the Shady Lady.

In September and October 1944, the 5th and 13th Air Forces under the command of General George Kenney launched a series of five raids from Morotai and  Noemfoor Islands. Kenney was a strong advocate for using the powerful B-29 Superfortress for this raid but was forced to use the B-24 Liberator instead. Unbeknownst to the Allied forces, the Japanese Air Force had conserved many of its dwindling numbers of fighters to protect the important oil refineries. The first two raids did not have fighter cover and suffered severe losses.

The 1945 Battle of Balikpapan concluded the Borneo campaign and Allied forces took control of Borneo island. Extensive wartime damage curtailed almost all oil production in the area until Royal Dutch Shell completed major repairs in 1950.

CIA air raid
In 1958, the CIA attacked Balikpapan and stopped oil exports. The US was running a CIA covert mission to undermine President Sukarno's government by supporting right-wing rebels in Indonesia. The CIA, Taiwan and the Philippines had provided the Permesta rebels in North Sulawesi with an insurgent air force, the Angkatan Udara Revolusioner (AUREV). On 28 April 1958, a CIA pilot, William H. Beale, flying a B-26 Invader bomber aircraft that was painted black and showing no markings, dropped  of four bombs on Balikpapan. The first damaged the runway at Sultan Aji Muhammad Sulaiman Airport, the second set the British oil tanker  on fire and sank her and the third bounced off the British tanker  without exploding. Beale's fourth bomb set on fire and sank the Indonesian Navy  KRI Hang Tuah, killing 18 crew and wounding 28. Before attacking Hang Tuah, Beale also machine-gunned the oil pipes to Shell's wharf.

The CIA had orders to attack unarmed foreign merchant ships in order to drive foreign trade away from Indonesia and weaken its economy, with the intention of undermining Sukarno's government. The day before attacking Balikpapan, Beale had also damaged a Shell complex at Ambon, Maluku. His Balikpapan raid succeeded in persuading Shell to suspend tanker services from Balikpapan and withdraw shore-based wives and families to Singapore. However, on 18 May Indonesian naval and air forces off Ambon Island shot down an AUREV B-26 and captured its CIA pilot, Allen Pope. The US immediately withdrew support for Permesta, whose rebellion rapidly diminished thereafter.

Subsequent history
Shell continued operating in the area until Indonesian state-owned Pertamina took it over in 1965. Lacking technology, skilled manpower, and capital to explore the petroleum region, Pertamina sublet petroleum concession contracts to multinational companies in the 1970s.

With the only oil refinery site in the region, Balikpapan emerged as a revitalized center of petroleum production. Pertamina opened its East Borneo headquarters in the city, followed by branch offices established by other international oil companies. Hundreds of laborers from Indonesia, along with skilled expatriates who served as managers and engineers, flocked into the city.

Geography

Topography
Topography of Balikpapan is generally hilly (85%), with only small areas of flat land (15%), mostly along the coast and surrounding the hilly areas. The hills are less than  higher than the adjacent valleys. The city proper itself is located on eastern side of Bay of Balikpapan.

Most of the soil in Balikpapan contains yellow-reddish podsolic soil and alluvial and quartz sand, making it extremely prone to erosion.

Climate
Balikpapan features a tropical rainforest climate (Af) as there is no real dry season in Balikpapan. Balikpapan generally shows little variation in weather throughout the course of the year. The city does not have significantly wetter and drier periods of the year and average temperatures are nearly identical throughout the course of the year, averaging about  throughout the year.

Ecology

In Wain River Protection Forest, which is the main water catchment area and habitat for endangered species of Borneo, the community begins to encroach on how to burn it so that during the dry season some areas become barren and damage 40%. The area of Wain River forest reaches , slowly but surely continues to decrease, leaving  with forest conditions that are still good at only 63 percents. Residents around looked for wood to cook in the forest even though the surrounding area had been lined with wire. Previously between 2000 and 2001, illegal logging occurred in 10 to 15 points in the Wain River forest, and in 2009 this forest was hit by a fire along with the Manggar River forest which made  of forest area engulfed in fire. The threat of coal mining from the surrounding area which provides mining permits such as Paser and Kutai Kartanegara also disrupts the border ecosystem of Wain River forest.

The forest in the middle of this city has been surrounded by residential areas. The protected forest of the Manggar River also suffered considerable damage, which is around 60%. The reservoirs in this forest are also threatened because coal mining fields and brick mills were set up so close that there was siltation of reservoir water. The majority of those who founded it were even known to be immigrant communities. In addition, the construction of the Samarinda-Balikpapan toll road planned by the East Kalimantan government which divides the forest for 8 kilometers across the reservoir could damage the quality of the clean water reserve in Balikpapan.

Forest damage resulted in Balikpapan being easily hit by floods and landslides when it was hit by heavy rains. Clean water supply is also decreasing because water absorption is narrowing, erosion is easily to occur and sediment from mining sites that flow into the river worsens and lowers reservoirs, coupled with Balikpapan conditions has few rivers and less fertile land. The population of the Balikpapan's mascot, the sun bear is fewer and only 50 are left. This is due to coal mining which narrows the habitat of sun bears, so its are reluctant to reproduce. In addition to sun bears, other Balikpapan animals that are declared endangered are proboscis monkeys, borneo gibbon, bornean orangutans, pangolin and otter civet. Whereas extinct animals in Balikpapan are Bornean Banteng (Bos javanicus lowi).

Administrative divisions
Balikpapan is bordered by Kutai Kartanegara Regency to the North, by the Makassar Strait to the South and East, and by Penajam North Paser Regency to the West. The city is divided into 6 districts (kecamatan) subdivided into 34 urban villagess (kelurahan) tabulated below with their 2010 and 2020 Census populations, and the official estimates as at mid 2021.

Demographics
During the Suharto dictatorship Balikpapan achieved unprecedented economic growth by attracting foreign investments, particularly in the exploitation of natural and mineral resources. The policy was heavily criticized for uncontrolled environmental damage and corrupt bureaucrats and politicians, but it significantly boosted urban development in resource-rich cities. In the 1970s Balikpapan experienced 7% population growth annually, while exports of timber and petroleum increased dramatically.

The indigenous tribe of Balikpapan is the Balik ethnic group which is a minority. Based on its origin, migrants come from neighbouring islands such as Java, Madura and Sulawesi. Residents mainly from ethnic migrants who have long settled in Balikpapan, namely from the ethnic Banjar, Bugis, Makassar, and Javanese. Other migrants including ethnic Minahasan, Gorontaloan, Madurese, and Sundanese. At the beginning of June 2014, the population reached 684,339 people with the number of arrivals during 2012 of 21,486 people, the highest number in the past three years. The number of migrants was able to exceed the number of newcomers who entered in Singapore in the same year which was as many as 20,693 inhabitants. The highest number of arrivals came from Java, which was 30%, then followed by Banjar and Bugis each by 20%, Toraja by 11%, Madura by 8%, Buton by 7% and Betawi by 4%.

Indonesian Most Liveable City
Based on Indonesian Most Liveable City Index which measured 27 indicators in every 2 years, Balikpapan is the best city for living in 2013 and toppled Yogyakarta as the best in 2011 and 2009. Balikpapan mainly maintained city management aspects and environment wellbeing. As part of the Earth Hour City Challenge, the city of Balikpapan, Indonesia was recognized as the Most Loveable City for 2015. In 2016, Balikpapan was nominated for the second time as the most lovable and sustainable city, pending final judgement.

Economy

Some multinational corporations operate in East Borneo. Companies including Baker Hughes (US), ChevronTexaco (US), Halliburton (US), Pertamina (Indonesia), Schlumberger (France), Thiess (Australia), TotalEnergies (France) and Weatherford International (US) use Balikpapan as their base of operations in the region. Governmental public services including Bank Indonesia, the Finance Department, Angkasa Pura 1, the Port of Semayang, and several others also attract many people to work in this area.

Balikpapan has been chosen as the site of some important governmental agencies such as Komando Daerah Militer VI Tanjungpura and Kepolisian Daerah Kaltim.

Founded in 1922, it is the oldest refinery in the area. The Allies destroyed it in the Second World War and Shell re-built it in 1950. The refinery has two subunits, Balikpapan I and Balikpapan II.

Balikpapan I has two raw oil refinery units that produce naphtha, kerosene, gasoline, diesel fuel, and residue and one high-vacuum unit that produces  of paraffin oil distillate (POD), used as raw material for wax factories. The wax itself has various grades and is sold domestically and internationally.

Opened on 1 November 1983, Balikpapan II has a hydro-skimming and hydro-cracking refinery and produces petrol, LPG, naphtha, kerosene, and diesel fuel.

Indonesian government and their Pertamina planning as for 2017 expanding the oil refinery including the area of Persiba Balikpapan FC (old) stadium and Pertamina residents near the refinery. Balikpapan's former mayor Rizal Effendi ask for primarily using Balikpapan peoples as worker that Pertamina needed up to 20.000 new employers.

Tourism
As a coastal city, Balikpapan has many beaches, including Manggar Beach, Segara Beach, Monument Beach, Kemala Beach, and Brigade Mobile Beach near the police academy. Melawai Beach is the most popular for local citizens.

Balikpapan is a departure point for nature tourism. Wain River Protected Forest, a Balikpapan natural reserve covering 10,000 hectares and also the habitat to a number of endangered animals, like the Beruang Madu (honey bear) which are sun bears endemic to the area, Orangutans and Proboscis monkeys or Bekantan. Wain river reserve, moreover, houses a number of endangered plants. Near Balikpapan is also a crocodile farm called Teritip, in Lamaru.

There is also a well-known forest site which has been developed for visitors at Bukit Bangkirai rainforest, about 45 minutes by car from Balikpapan.

A mangrove forest at Kariangau is a worthwhile tourist attraction at Balikpapan. There are still some Japanese artillery sites from World War II, and there is a military monument at Kampung Baru.

Balikpapan Botanical Garden
It is the first Botanical Garden in Kalimantan as a part of Hutan Lindung Sungai Wain (Wain River Conservation Forest) with total area  and still has orangutan, sunbear, deer, and some endemic species of Kalimantan birds. Balikpapan Botanical Garden, which is located at kilometer 15 on Jalan Soekarno Hatta, was officially opened on 20 August 2014. At the opening ceremony, Forestry Minister Zulkifli Hasan expressed the hope that the Botanical Garden would rival Gardens by the Bay in Singapore.

Shopping
As one of the fastest developing cities in the nation, Balikpapan has been supported by the rise of shopping centers. There are six major shopping malls in town which are Plaza Balikpapan, Balikpapan Superblock, Pentacity Mall Balikpapan, Balcony City, Mall Fantasy in Balikpapan Baru, and Plaza Kebun Sayur.

Transport

Airport

Balikpapan is served by Sultan Aji Muhammad Sulaiman Airport, which was previously known as Sepinggan airport. The airport has capacity to serve 10 million passengers per year, as well as immigration, passenger convenience, company reps offices, restaurants, shopping and many others. The airport is equipped with 11 aerobridges and four-level parking garages.

Seaports
There are several public and private sea ports located at Balikpapan Bay. Semayang seaport serves commercial boats to many destinations to Indonesia including Jakarta, Makassar, Manado, Pare Pare and Surabaya. In the 1990s maritime transport was very popular. Today, due to more affordable and efficient airplane travel, more people choose to fly. Taking the ferry is a main choice for traveling to Penajam. Kariangau Seaport was built to serve containers and all other industrial needs. It is located in km.13, as part of Kariangau Industrial Estate.

Public transport
There are various kinds of local transport, including angkot, ojek, taxicabs and shuttle bus service. Online transportation are also available.

Bus terminal 
There is main bus terminal is Terminal Batu Ampar (located in Batu Ampar, Balikpapan Utara) and one of major destination rute is Samarinda.

Balikpapan-Samarinda Toll Road
Balikpapan is connected by Trans-Kalimantan Highway Southern Route. From Balikpapan to Samarinda, the highway runs in parallel with the first controlled-access expressway in Borneo, the Balikpapan–Samarinda Toll Road was operational by the beginning of 2020 in section 2–4, and opened in section 1 and 5 in May 2021.

Famous peoples
 

Rusdiansyah (born 1985), former Indonesian footballer

 , actor and model (played by Ustadz Addin) in the soap opera Lorong Waktu'' season 3 to 6

 Bima Sakti, former Indonesian footballer and coach of Indonesia national under-17 football team

 Mr. Gamayel, member of the National Police and Komika won 3rd place in Stand Up Comedy Indonesia 6th edition

 , Indonesian rapper, singer and actor

 , reform hero and Trisakti University student who was a victim of the Trisakti shootings

Notes

References

External links

 
 
 JoTravelGuide.com  – A comprehensive up to date travel guide to Balikpapan

 
Populated places in East Kalimantan